Kapparis is a coastal village in Cyprus near Paralimni and Protaras, and  and part of the Famagusta district.

It is a relatively new tourist town and under heavy construction and development of buildings, therefore, most buildings are new. There are some air raid shelters at Kapparis built during the Turkish invasion of Cyprus in 1974. Visitors from the UK and  Greece come to the village on holiday, and there are a number of places to eat.
There are several beaches in Kapparis including the famous beach called Fireman's Beach.

The village and surrounding areas were owned by Britain in prior to 1950s when Cyprus was under Great Britain’s rule. Kapparis is part of the Famagusta district which still a divided district and much of the area in Famagusta is occupied by TurkeyTurkey. The coastal road in Kapparis is called Kennedy Ave.

Paralimni